Amen is the third studio album by Malian artist Salif Keita, released in 1991 by Mango Records. The album reached No. 1 on the Billboard World Albums chart.

Overview
Amen was produced by Joe Zawinul.

Critical reception
Amen was Grammy nominated in the category of Best World Music Album.

Track listing
"Yele n Na"
"Waraya"
"Tono"
"Kuma" - Speak
"Nyanafi" - Nostalgia
"Karifa"
"N B'I Fe" - I love you
"Lony" - Knowledge

Kuma 
If you drop a child you can catch it, but if a word is out you cannot catch it anymore. One has to learn to speak, if you do not believe ask a lawyer. One has to learn to speak, if you do not believe this ask a griot.

Nyanafi 
Nyanafi means nostalgia, and the song is about the importance of life.
If you think you will buy a car, if the death comes you will forget it. If you think you will buy an airplane, if the death comes you will forget it. If you see a young boy in his death clothes you will know that life is nothing. If you see a young girl in her death clothes you will know that life is nothing. If you are complaining, and you remember that image of the young boy, it will calm you down.

Lony 
Lony means knowledge. All depends on the knowledge to do something.

References

1991 albums
Salif Keita albums
Mango Records albums